Dragonfly is the group which represented Croatia in the Eurovision Song Contest 2007 in Helsinki, Finland. Members are Drago Vidakovic, Branko Kuznar, Branko Badanjak, and Iva Gluhak.

Songs in Croatian
"Reci mi da znam"
"Gledam u sunce"
"Dođi mi pod bor"
"Vjerujem u ljubav" (2007 ESC entry)

Eurovision Song Contest entrants for Croatia
Eurovision Song Contest entrants of 2007
Croatian pop music groups
Musical groups established in 1997